The statue of Hans Karl von Winterfeldt is a bronze sculpture installed at Zietenplatz in Berlin, Germany.

References

External links

 

Bronze sculptures in Germany
Mitte
Statues in Berlin
Outdoor sculptures in Berlin
Sculptures of men in Germany
Statues in Germany